John Bundy is an American magician and magic consultant based in South Plainfield, New Jersey. He is owner of John Bundy Productions, a company that produces shows for theme parks and corporate events and provides technical advice for television, movies and stage shows. As a performer, Bundy specialises in magic with a humorous edge and in shows with horror and Halloween themes. For some of his performances he assumes the alias of Wacky Dracky, a spoof vampire character.

Bundy began performing as a magician while studying theatre at Rider University in New Jersey. After graduating in 1975 he worked in a magic shop before setting up John Bundy Productions in 1982 to produce magic shows as marketing events for shopping centres. In 1994 he was joined by an assistant named Morgan who has become a long-term performing partner. The pair generally work under the billing of "John Bundy and Morgan". John Bundy Productions has also launched Morgan as a solo escapology act under the name "Morgan the Escapist".

John Bundy and Morgan were featured in Paramount Picture's 2010 release Morning Glory.  Their television credits that include two appearances on the Late Show with David Letterman, Ricki Lake, the Gordon Elliott Show and The Fox Kids Network as well as several appearances in commercials. Bundy and his work have featured in various industry periodicals and he was the subject of a cover feature for the October 2005 issue of Magic magazine, which described him as "Halloween magic's greatest innovator".

References

Further reading
 "John Bundy: Magic in the malls and more", Magic Manuscript,  November/ December 1988 (9-page cover story)
 "John Bundy: A World of Mall Magic", Laugh-Makers, October 1985. (4-page cover story)
 "John Bundy: The Classic Illusions volume three, "Paul Osborne", 2010.
 "John Bundy: Tricks'N'Treats", the book of Halloween magic, "John Bundy", 2016  1878 Press Co.
 John Bundy:  "1000 faces of illusion", Vanish Magic Magazine, October 2017 (Cover story)
 John Bundy:  "Return of the ghost show", Vanish Magic Magazine, October 2022
 John Bundy:  "Target: Midnight", The incredible story of the midnight magic spook shows & seances!, " Abbotts Magic" August 2022

External links
 John Bundy Productions

Living people
Year of birth missing (living people)
American magicians
People from South Plainfield, New Jersey
Rider University alumni